Anchomenus virescens is a species of ground beetle in the subfamily Platyninae. It is found in Ukraine, the southern part of Russia, and the East Palaearctic.

References

Platyninae
Beetles of Asia
Beetles of Europe
Beetles described in 1865
Taxa named by Victor Motschulsky